The Elliott House is a historic house at 303 South Third Street in Bentonville, Arkansas. It is a large three-story brick house with Italianate style, built in 1887 for Harry Elliott, who made a fortune investing in silver mines in Silver City, New Mexico. The exterior features include seven porches, a widow's walk, and carved brackets in deeply overhanging eaves.

The house was listed on the National Register of Historic Places in 1978.

See also
National Register of Historic Places listings in Benton County, Arkansas

References

Houses on the National Register of Historic Places in Arkansas
Italianate architecture in Arkansas
Houses completed in 1887
Houses in Bentonville, Arkansas
National Register of Historic Places in Bentonville, Arkansas
Individually listed contributing properties to historic districts on the National Register in Arkansas
1887 establishments in Arkansas